Agostino Perini (1802–1878) was an Italian naturalist.

1802 births
1878 deaths
19th-century Italian people
Italian naturalists